Isaac Bird (1793-1876) was one of the first Protestant missionaries in Syria. He was best known for his 1876 publication Bible work in Bible lands: or, Events in the history of the Syria mission.

He undertook a number of journeys throughout Syria and Palestine, primarily in the 1820s and 1830s. 

In 1825 he had a school with 85 Syrian pupils. In 1833, he wrote his Thirteen Letters in reply to the Maronite Bishop of Beirut, which were printed in Arabic at the American Press that had been moved to Beirut in April of that year.

He left Syria in 1836, and died forty years later in Hartford, Connecticut.

References

Bibliography

External links
 THE SEVEN PIONEERS OF SYRIA MISSION WORK - ISAAC BIRD, THE HISTORIAN; PAGE 5 OF 9: ISAAC BIRD, THE HISTORIAN

Protestant missionaries in Syria
Missionary educators
1793 births
1876 deaths